St Mary’s Church, Tissington is a Grade II* listed parish church in the Church of England in Tissington, Derbyshire.

History

The church dates from the 12th century, and the chancel and south porch still date from this time. The doorway has a Norman tympanum with two standing sculpted figures. The church was restored in 1854 when a new aisle was added on the north side.

Parish status
The church is in a joint parish with
St Michael and All Angels’ Church, Alsop-en-le-Dale
St Edmund’s Church, Fenny Bentley
St Peter's Church, Parwich
St Leonard’s Church, Thorpe

Memorials

Francis FitzHerbert (d. 1619)
Sir John FitzHerbert (d.1643)
Frank Richard Allsop (d.1912), died on Titanic.

Organ

The church contains a pipe organ by Albert Keates of Sheffield. A specification of the organ can be found on the National Pipe Organ Register.

See also
Grade II* listed buildings in Derbyshire Dales
Listed buildings in Tissington and Lea Hall

References

Church of England church buildings in Derbyshire
Grade II* listed churches in Derbyshire